The third season of Bachelor in Paradise Australia premiered on 15 July 2020. Osher Günsberg reprised his role as host from the previous two series and the Bachelor Australia franchise.

Intended to air in April 2020, the airing of the show was held back by 10 to cover for the production shut-downs caused by the COVID-19 pandemic. The series premiered on 15 July 2020.

Contestants
Abbie, Ciarran, Timm, Brittany and Jamie were revealed on 13 March 2020. Helena, Mary, Brittney and Cass were further announced on 17 June 2020. The full returning Episode 1 cast were revealed on 6 July 2020, which included Jake, Glenn, Janey and Niranga. Keira was also announced as an intruder and she first appeared in episode five. Jessica was announced as an intruder at the end of the first episode and Renee was announced at the end of the second, making their first appearance in the second and third episodes respectively. Alisha was announced as an intruder on 19 July 2020. Conor, Chris and Tim, who had not appeared on any season of The Bachelorette or a Bachelor franchise series, were announced as intruders on 22 July 2020. Kiki entered Paradise as an intruder in episode 5 and Jackson, Matt and Scot in episode 7.

Elimination table

Colour Key
 The contestant is male.
 The contestant is female.
 The contestant went on a date and gave out a rose at the rose ceremony.
 The contestant went on a date and received a rose at the rose ceremony.
 The contestant gave or received a rose at the rose ceremony, thus remaining in the competition.
 The contestant received the last rose.
 The contestant went on a date and received the last rose.
 The contestant went on a date and was eliminated.
 The contestant was eliminated. 
 The contestant had a date and voluntarily left the show.
 The contestant voluntarily left the show.
 The couple left the show together but later split.
 The couple broke up and were eliminated.
 The couple decided to stay together, but split after Bachelor in Paradise Australia ended.
 The couple decided to stay together and won the competition.

Notes

Episodes

Ratings

References

External links
 

2020 Australian television seasons
Australian (season 03)
Television productions postponed due to the COVID-19 pandemic